Voorhies is an unincorporated community in Unity Township, Piatt County, Illinois, United States. Voorhies Castle, which is listed on the National Register of Historic Places, is located in Voorhies.

References

Unincorporated communities in Piatt County, Illinois
Unincorporated communities in Illinois